Robert Everett "Bob" Harper (born March 24, 1955) is an American film producer. In a Hollywood career spanning 30 years, he has marketed over 400 films including Titanic, Mr. and Mrs. Smith, Planet of the Apes, X-Men, the Star Wars trilogy and Home Alone, and collaborated with some of the most influential directors of the past twenty-five years, including George Lucas, Steven Spielberg, James Cameron and Tim Burton.

Career
Harper was born and raised in Washington D.C. He served as general manager at Kaleidoscope Films from 1980 to 1985. He joined 20th Century Fox in 1986, working on trailers and creative advertising before becoming president of domestic marketing in 1989. He later served as a producer for Fox, developing and producing the 1993 hit comedy Rookie of the Year. Returning to Fox in 1995, Harper was president of worldwide marketing, vice chairman of 20th Century Fox, executive vice president of parent company Fox Filmed Entertainment, and vice chairman of Fox Filmed Entertainment.

Harper was chairman and chief executive officer of Fox-based production and distribution company New Regency Productions from 2007 until 2011. He executive produced the films What's Your Number?, In Time, and The Darkest Hour.

References

Externals

Further reading
 "Regency draws Harper", Variety
 "HBO Lands Leonardo DiCaprio Project With New Regency Titled 'Beat The Reaper'", Deadline.com
 "Shocker! New Regency Co-Chairmen Bob Harper And Hutch Parker To Exit", Deadline.com
 "For Harper, trust equals stability", Variety
 Daily Variety, July 16, 1990 by Claudia Eller, "Sherak Adds Duties, Harper Going Indie in Revamp of Marketing Distribution Wings"
 The Wall Street Journal, November 9, 1990, "Fox, Bob Harper Resigned as President of Domestic Marketing."
 Daily Variety, November 9, 1990, "Harper Confirms return to Production."
 Daily Variety, December 21, 1994 by Beth Lasky "Harper Back in Saddle at Fox, Indy Producer returns to Former Post as Marketing Prexy."
 Advertising Age Magazine, October 7, 1996 by Jeff Jensen and Chuck Ross, "Hey Sponsors: You Oughta Be in Pictures or TV," page 26.
 Advertising Age Magazine, June 30, 1997 by Jeff Jensen, "The Marketing 100," page 33.
 Advertising Age Magazine, October 5, 1998 by Jeff Jensen, "The Power 50," page 2
 The Hollywood Reporter, January 29, 1998 by Wayne Friedman, "Harper will do the Marketing for more of Fox."
 Advertising Age Magazine, March 23, 1998 by Jeff Jensen, "Ex-Producer Harper Takes Fox's Global Ad Challenge."
 Daily Variety, November 15, 2000 by Charles Lyons, "Harper Ferried to Fox Posts, Fox Names Harper to Key Film Post."
 The Hollywood Reporter, November 15, 2000 by Beth Lasky, "Harper Expands Territory at Fox."
 The Hollywood Reporter, December 16, 2004 by Greg Kilday, "Fox Film Ups Harper to vice-chair."
 Daily Variety, March 27, 2007 by Pamela McClintock, "Regency Reloads, Fox vice-chair Hops to Head Milchan Banner."
 The Hollywood Reporter, March 27, 2007 "Harper Tops Bill at Regency."

American film producers
1955 births
Living people